= Marc Hanewinkel =

German forestry scientist

Marc Hanewinkel (born 9 January 1963) is a German forest scientist and forest economist. Since 2014 he has been a full professor and head of the Chair of Forestry Economics and Forest Planning at the University of Freiburg.His research deals with the economic effects of climate change on forests, risk and uncertainty in forest management, and strategies for adapting forests to a changing climate.From 2026 he is one of three spokespersons of the Future Forests Cluster of Excellence, funded by the German Research Foundation (DFG).A 2013 study he led in Nature Climate Change projected losses in the economic value of European forest land by 2100.

== Education ==
Hanewinkel studied forest science at the University of Freiburg from 1983 to 1988, including a period at ETH Zurich in 1985 and 1986, and graduated as a Diplom-Forstwirt. He completed his doctorate at Freiburg's Institute of Forest Economics in 1997 with a thesis on single-tree selection forestry and the conversion of stands to selection forests in the Black Forest region. In 2003 he completed his habilitation in forest economics and forest planning, with a thesis on decision support for complex management tasks, using forest conversion and risk management as examples.

== Career ==
From 1998 to 2002 Hanewinkel worked as a research assistant at the Institute of Forest Economics of the University of Freiburg, and in 2002 he held a research stay at the University of California, Berkeley. From 2003 he worked at the Forest Research Institute of Baden-Württemberg (FVA) in Freiburg, where from 2007 to 2011 he led the working group on climate impact research. In 2006 he was also appointed an extraordinary (apl.) professor at the Faculty of Forest and Environmental Sciences of the University of Freiburg.[13] In 2011 he was ranked first on the shortlist for a professorship in forest economics at the University of Natural Resources and Life Sciences, Vienna (BOKU). From June 2011 he headed the research unit on forest resources and forest management at the Swiss Federal Institute for Forest, Snow and Landscape Research (WSL) in Birmensdorf.

Since October 2014 he has held the chair of forestry economics and forest planning at the University of Freiburg. Since 2024 he has also been an adjunct professor at the John H. Daniels Faculty of Architecture, Landscape and Design at the University of Toronto.

== Research ==
Hanewinkel's work focuses on risk analysis and modelling in forestry, the effects of climate change on forests in Europe and Central America, adaptive management strategies, and decision making under uncertainty.

In a 2013 paper in Nature Climate Change, written with Dominik Cullmann, Mart-Jan Schelhaas, Gert-Jan Nabuurs and Niklaus Zimmermann, he projected that by 2100 the value of forest land in Europe, excluding Russia, could fall by between 14 and 50 percent, with a mean of 28 percent at a 2 percent interest rate. The decline was linked mainly to the retreat of Norway spruce.The study was reported by the European Commission's CORDIS service and by other outlets.

He has coordinated or co-coordinated international projects on adapting forests to climate change, including MOTIVE under the EU Seventh Framework Programme and MANFRED under the Interreg Alpine Space programme. He co-edited the 2013 volume Management Strategies to Adapt Alpine Space Forests to Climate Change Risks, which came out of MANFRED. With colleagues at the European Forest Institute he co-authored the 2017 policy brief Leading the way to a European circular bioeconomy strategy. His later work with Freiburg colleagues includes studies of tropical reforestation in Central America, such as a 2023 paper in Science Advances on productivity declines in tropical reforestations at high mean annual temperatures.

Hanewinkel is also an editor of the Allgemeine Forst- und Jagdzeitung (German Journal of Forest Research), with a history of more than 190 years the oldest forestry scientific journal worldwide. He is also an associate editor of Annals of Forest Science, PLOS ONE and the Journal of Forest Economics.

In 2025 the DFG and the German Science and Humanities Council selected the Future Forests Cluster of Excellence at Freiburg for funding from 1 January 2026. Hanewinkel is one of its three spokespersons, together with Jürgen Bauhus and Friederike Lang.

== Awards ==
- 2007: Schweighofer Innovation Prize, for the internet platform waldwissen.net.
- 2018: elected associate correspondent (correspondant associé) of the Académie d'Agriculture de France, in its section on forests and the wood sector.

== Selected publications ==
- Hanewinkel, M.; Cullmann, D. A.; Schelhaas, M.-J.; Nabuurs, G.-J.; Zimmermann, N. E. (2013). "Climate change may cause severe loss in the economic value of European forest land". Nature Climate Change 3: 203 to 207. doi:10.1038/nclimate1687
- Baumbach, L.; Hickler, T.; Yousefpour, R.; Hanewinkel, M. (2023). "High economic costs of declined carbon sink and habitat loss in Central American forests". Nature Communications 14: 2043. doi:10.1038/s41467-023-37796-z.
- Nölte, A.; Cifuentes-Jara, M.; Yousefpour, R.; Hanewinkel, M. (2023). "Sharp decline in future productivity of tropical reforestations above 29 °C mean annual temperature". Science Advances 9 (34). doi:10.1126/sciadv.adg9175
- Cerbu, G.; Hanewinkel, M.; Gerosa, G.; Jandl, R. (eds.) (2013). Management Strategies to Adapt Alpine Space Forests to Climate Change Risks. InTech. ISBN 978-953-51-1194-8.
